AdultSwine is malware discovered in 2018 by Check Point Software Technologies. The malware was found programmed into around 60 apps on the Google Play Store, primarily those aimed at children. The bug would display pornographic ads that, when clicked on, would instruct victims to download more malicious software in an attempt to steal personal data. It's estimated that between 3 and 7 million users may have been infected.

According to a representative for Google, the apps have been removed from the Play Store and all developer accounts associated with the apps have been locked. Check Point cautions users to "be extra vigilant when installing apps, particularly those intended for use by children.”

References

External links 

 List of infected apps

Android (operating system) malware